Chlopsis slusserorum is an eel in the family Chlopsidae. It was described by Kenneth A. Tighe and John E. McCosker in 2003. It is a marine, deep-water eel which is known from Fiji and the Solomon Islands, in the western central Pacific Ocean. It typically dwells at a depth of 366–487 m. Males can reach a maximum total length of 14.1 cm.

The specific epithet honours Marion and Willis Slusser, whom the authors credit with supporting research and education in natural history.

References

Chlopsidae
Fish described in 2003